The girls' combined competition of the 2020 Winter Youth Olympics was held at the Les Diablerets Alpine Centre, Switzerland, on Friday, 10 January (Super-G) and Saturday, 11 January (slalom). The results of the Super-G competition will be counted towards the combined result.

Results
The Super-G was started on 10 January at 10:15. The slalom was started on 11 January at 12:30.

References

Girls' combined